Ahmad-Reza Radan is an Iranian military officer who served as Iran's Chief of police, the chief commander of Law Enforcement Command of the Islamic Republic of Iran since January 2023.

He was deputy commander of the Iranian police and as Tehran's police chief, infamous for his crackdown on "unislamic" hair and dress style.

Radan started his career as a member of Iranian Revolutionary Guards during the Iran–Iraq War, and he also served as a commander during the war. He also held various posts in the Islamic Republic of Iran Police (IRIP), including as police commander of Razavi Khorasan Province. During the war, he was injured more than four times, but returned to war-zone to defend his country against Iraqi forces.

Radan is well known for his actions on Islamic dress code and distribution of illegal drugs as well as controlling thug gangs. He served as police commander of Kurdistan Province, Sistan and Baluchestan Province, Khorasan Province, and also Tehran Province, the most important province in Iran.

Radan has been designated by the United States as a person who is, "among other things, responsible for or complicit in, or responsible for ordering, controlling, or otherwise directing, the commission of serious human rights abuses against citizens of Iran or their family members."

Public Security Plan and Moralization Campaign
In 2007, Ahmad-Reza Radan launched a "Public Security Plan". The police arrested dozens of "thugs" to increase public security. The thugs were sometimes beaten on camera in front of neighborhood inhabitants, or forced to wear hanging watering cans used for lavatory ablutions around their necks. Among the arrested people was Meysam Lotfi, a young Iranian who was previously arrested during Iran student riots in July 1999 and jailed for 6 months. According to his parents, he has never had any criminal records or background of illegal action, and has never been arrested or jailed before, omitting the 1999 riots event. He was listed for execution, a sentence that was later changed to a three-year prison sentence after the media coverage and the attempts of his parents as well as human-rights activists. His former lawyer was Abdolfattah Soltani.

Notes

External links
 Iran Human Rights Documentation Center. "Violent Aftermath: The 2009 Election and Suppression of Dissent in Iran." Feb. 2010, New Haven, CT. https://web.archive.org/web/20100602191028/http://www.iranhrdc.org/httpdocs/English/pdfs/Reports/Violent%20Aftermath.pdf p. 51

Living people
Chief commanders of Law Enforcement Force of Islamic Republic of Iran
Military personnel from Isfahan
Islamic Revolutionary Guard Corps personnel of the Iran–Iraq War
1963 births
Iranian individuals subject to the U.S. Department of the Treasury sanctions